Burt is a parish in County Donegal, Ireland, on the main road between Letterkenny and Derry.

Location

At the base of the Inishowen Peninsula, Burt is part the parish of Fahan. 
The ancient Grianán of Aileach stone fort dates to 1700BC.  On a clear day, it is possible to see the hills of seven counties of Ireland and the Ulster coastline, particularly Lough Swilly, Inch Island and Lough Foyle. From Grianán hill you can see the extent of the reclaimed land at Inch Level which was enclosed by three embankments in 1856. Burt Roman Catholic Chapel on N13 was modelled after the Grianán of Aileach. The Presbyterian congregation nearby dates from 1673, but the present church was built in 1896.

Travellers along the main N13 road from Derry to Letterkenny also see the remains of the Burt Distillery with its stone chimney, in use during the 18th and 19th centuries at Bohullion.

History

Burt Castle stands on top of Castlehill and dates from 16th century; it has strong connections with the O'Doherty clan.

Behind Castlehill, on the edge of Lough Swilly, are the remains of an abbey or church at Grange. The churchyard at Grange contains some of the earliest grave stones in this area dating from 17th Century. On the walls of the old building are gravestones and tablets showing the graves of Rev. Andrew Ferguson Sen the second Presbyterian minister of Burt 1690 to 1725 and also his son Rev. Andrew Ferguson Jun who succeeded his father as Minister of Burt from 1725 to 1787.

Notable people
 Josias Leslie Porter (1823–1889) – Presbyterian missionary; President of Queen's College, Belfast
 Joseph McLaughlin (1867-1926) – U.S. Republican Congressman from Pennsylvania
 W. D. Flackes (1921-1993) – BBC political correspondent
 Paul Callaghan (Gaelic footballer) (born 1971) - Gaelic footballer

References

Civil parishes of County Donegal